James T. Rosenbaum (born September 29, 1949) is an American physician-scientist who is Chief of Ophthalmology emeritus at the Legacy Devers Eye Institute, Portland, Oregon, where he held the Richard Chenoweth Chair, and Chief of Arthritis and Rheumatic Diseases at the Oregon Health & Science University where he holds the Edward E Rosenbaum Professorship in Inflammation Research. Rosenbaum is the only practicing rheumatologist/non-ophthalmologist in the world to serve as a chief of ophthalmology. He is recognized for his description of an animal model of uveitis (inflammation inside the eye) resulting from injection of bacterial endotoxin (Nature, 286:611, 1980) and for more than 600 scholarly publications, mostly related to the intersection between rheumatology and ophthalmology. He is a co-author of the book, "The Clinical Neurology of Rheumatic Diseases".

Education
Rosenbaum is a National Merit Scholar who graduated from Harvard College in 1971, magna cum laude. He graduated from Yale Medical School with honors in 1975. He did an internship and residency in internal medicine at Stanford Medical Center from 1975 to 1978. He was a fellow of the Arthritis Foundation under the supervision of Hugh O. McDevitt at Stanford from 1978 to 1981.

Family
Rosenbaum is part of a notable family that includes ten physicians including his father, Edward E Rosenbaum, author of "A Taste of My Own Medicine: When the Doctor Is the Patient". His maternal grandmother was Rose Naftalin.

Honors
Rosenbaum is an elected member of the American Society of Clinical Investigation and the Association of American Physicians. He was given a lifetime achievement award from the American Academy of Ophthalmology. He was awarded the Friedenwald Award from the Association for Research in Vision and Ophthalmology in 2011, the Gold Medal from the International Uveitis Study Group Eye Foundation in 2012, the Cless Award from the University of Illinois, Chicago in 2012, and the American College of Rheumatology Distinguished Clinician Scholar Award in 2013. His first authored papers or essays have appeared in journals that include Science, Nature, the New England Journal of Medicine, JAMA, Annals of Internal Medicine, the Archives of Internal Medicine and the online source for physicians, UpToDate.

References

1949 births
Living people
American ophthalmologists
American rheumatologists
Harvard University alumni
Yale School of Medicine alumni